Horseshoe Council Bluffs is a casino and former greyhound racing track in Council Bluffs, Iowa, near Omaha, Nebraska. It is owned by Vici Properties and operated by Caesars Entertainment. It has  of gaming space with 1,438 slot machines, 63 table games, a William Hill racebook, and a WSOP poker room. Accommodations are offered at an adjoining Hilton Garden Inn, and the nearby Country Inns & Suites, Holiday Inn Express and SpringHill Suites.

The Horseshoe holds the World Series of Poker Circuit Event during August of each calendar year, and the Horseshoe Poker Championships (HPC) during February in each year in their poker room.

Bluffs Run Greyhound Park opened in 1986. In March 1995, slot machines were added and the property became Bluffs Run Casino. Harveys Casino Resorts bought the property in 1999 for $165 million. Harrah's Entertainment (now Caesars Entertainment) acquired Harveys in 2001. In 2006, Harrah's completed an $85-million expansion and renovation of the casino and rebranded it as Horseshoe Council Bluffs. Greyhound racing ended in 2015. On October 6, 2017, ownership of the property was transferred to Vici Properties as part of a corporate spin-off, and it was leased back to Caesars Entertainment.

References

External links
 

1986 establishments in Iowa
Buildings and structures in Council Bluffs, Iowa
Caesars Entertainment
Casino hotels
Casinos completed in 1995
Casinos in Iowa
Hotel buildings completed in 1995
Hotels established in 1995
Hotels in Iowa
Defunct greyhound racing venues in the United States
Tourist attractions in Pottawattamie County, Iowa